"We Will Go to Mount Paektu" is a 2015 North Korean light music song in praise of the country's leader, Kim Jong-un.

The song is important politically, and its lyrics recount a highly symbolic trek onto Mount Paektu, important in North Korean propaganda, by Kim Jong-un.

The song is associated with the Moranbong Band but has been performed by other North Korean artists as well. Slovenian avant-garde group Laibach recorded an English-language cover version of the song and wanted to perform it in North Korea. Authorities of the country asked them to leave it out of their concert and the group complied.

Lyrics

Background
Songs had played an important part in the cult of personality of Kim Jong-un, whose succession of Kim Jong-il was accompanied by the song "Footsteps". Likewise, the purge of Jang Song-thaek, a major political event in Kim Jong-un's early career, was accompanied by "We Will Follow You Only". The release of "We Will Go to Mount Paektu" in turn coincided with soon-to-be-purged Minister of People's Armed Forces Hyon Yong-chol's visit abroad in Moscow.

The lyrics of "We Will Go to Mount Paektu", by Ri Ji-song, were released in Rodong Sinmun on 20 April 2015. The lyrics recount Kim Jong-un's trek to Mount Paektu, important in North Korean propaganda and described as the "sacred mountain of the Sun that gives [the people] the spirit of victory" by the lyrics of the song. The chorus of the song says:

The song took the center stage in Moranbong Band's concert on 28 April 2015. The song became one of the biggest hits of 2015 in North Korea. Other North Korean groups that have performed the song are the State Merited Chorus and the Kim Il-sung Youth League Art Propaganda Squad.

Laibach cover version
Slovenian avant-garde music group Laibach released an English-language cover version of the song. The band intended to play their version for a live audience in North Korea as part of their Liberation Day tour there, but North Korean officials censored them for having altered the song. Ivo Saliger of the group told Rolling Stone:

The row was apparently over the tempo of the song. Norwegian director Morten Traavik, who arranged the tour, said:

See also

Music of North Korea
Mt. Paektu (poem)

References

External links
Score and lyrics at Rodong Sinmun 
YouTube videos:
Video with Korean subtitles
Performance by Moranbong Band with English and Portuguese subtitles

North Korean propaganda songs
Propaganda songs
Propaganda in North Korea
Patriotic songs
Songs about Kim Jong-un
Songs about mountains
Songs about North Korea